Francesco Giorgi (born 19 February 1970) is an Italian judoka. He competed in the men's half-lightweight event at the 1996 Summer Olympics.

References

1970 births
Living people
Italian male judoka
Olympic judoka of Italy
Judoka at the 1996 Summer Olympics
Sportspeople from Cagliari
20th-century Italian people